Vorynino is a rural locality (a village) in Vtorovskoye Rural Settlement, Kameshkovsky District, Vladimir Oblast, Russia. The population was 2 as of 2010.

Geography 
Vorynino is located 26 km southwest of Kameshkovo (the district's administrative centre) by road. Gorki is the nearest rural locality.

References 

Rural localities in Kameshkovsky District